Harbach is a surname. Notable people with the surname include:

Barbara Harbach (born 1946), American composer, harpsichordist and organist
Chad Harbach (born 1975), American writer
Otto Harbach (1873–1963), American songwriter
William O. Harbach (1919-2017), American television producer